Robert Munn may refer to:
 Robert Stewart Munn, Scottish-born merchant and politician in Newfoundland
 Robert Munn (rower), American rower
 R. E. Munn (Robert Edward Munn), Canadian climatologist and meteorologist

See also
 Bob Munn, Australian rules footballer